Prashant Vaidya (born 23 September 1967) is a former Indian cricketer. He played domestic cricket for Bengal and played four One Day Internationals for India in 1995 and 1996.  At that time he was considered to be the fastest bowler in India.

References

Bengal cricketers
Indian cricketers
India One Day International cricketers
East Zone cricketers
Vidarbha cricketers
Central Zone cricketers
1967 births
Living people